The Chicoutimi River is a watercourse of eastern Quebec, Canada. Entirely located in the Chicoutimi borough of Saguenay, it is the most urbanized and dammed river in Saguenay–Lac-Saint-Jean.

Used by the Montagnais of the Saguenay River before the arrival of Europeans, it was at that time the first portage from the main access road to Lac Saint-Jean. In the 20th century, it was developed from its source to its mouth for hydropower purposes. In addition to being the source of drinking water for the Chicoutimi and Jonquière boroughs, this river has six dams (including 2 hydroelectric power plants in operation). During the Saguenay flood in 1996, its surge caused significant damage to Laterrière and Chicoutimi.

Geography

Course and hydrogeology 

The Chicoutimi River rises at Portage-des-Roches, in the Laterrière sector of the Chicoutimi borough at  altitude and flows northeast towards Laterrière-Bassin where it is spanned by the Père-Honorat bridge. Leaving the rocky base and the steep relief of Portage-de-Roches, it then enters an alluvial and semi-alluvial plain up to dam de la Chute-Garneau where the landscapes on both banks alternate between residences and agricultural land for a little over ten kilometers.

The Chute-Garneau dam is a watercourse retaining structure located on a rock base. Half a kilometer further on, route 170 crosses the river which then enters a more urbanized sector of the Chicoutimi borough. After having bypassed Pointe du Chien, it passes under Autoroute 70 and enters the Haut-Saguenay industrial park. The river then crosses the Pont-Arnaud dam and begins its increasingly rapid descent towards the Saguenay as the relief becomes increasingly steep. After passing under the Ulric Blackburn bridge (boulevard Barette) it flows into Lac Dubuc; the reservoir of the Chute-Blanchette dam. This retaining structure dries up the original rock bed of the river to divert it towards an underground water intake which supplies the S.P.C. ( Elkem Métal). The river then re-emerges in the historic site of the Pulperie de Chicoutimi and continues to descend to the Chicoutimi dam basin. Finally, it flows into the Saguenay River.

The Chicoutimi River flows mainly in the Saguenay graben, a vast elevated valley that overlooks the lowlands surrounding the Saguenay River. The soils of this large depression are composed of Quaternary marine sediments, such as silt and clay, deposited at the end of the Pleistocene and during the beginning of the Holocene by the Laflamme Sea. The composition of the soils and the strong acceleration of the runoff caused by unevenness in this sector are the main causes causing the river to cut, through marine clay, an incision from 10 to  until the parent rock giving it the appearance of a torrent.

Hydrography 
The basin territory includes sections of 6 unorganized territories, the municipality in four MRCs.

Flowing from south to north, the Chicoutimi River rises east of Kenogami Lake via the Portage-des-Roches dam in the old town from Laterrière (today Chicoutimi borough to Saguenay (city)). This river is artificially controlled over 

The first section, delimited by the dams of Portage-des-Roches and Pont-Arnaud, would represent a part in upstream of the river almost  in length. Located in the plain of Laterrière, south of Chicoutimi, this section would have a drop of barely  and would form a meander and a reservoir retained by the dams of Pont-Arnaud and Chute-Garneau.

The erosion of the river, barely visible upstream, becomes very apparent downstream because it has been dug, over time, in the granite of fjord, a small valley up to Saguenay River. The river is influenced by the tide only downstream of the Chicoutimi dam where it forms a basin.

Watershed

Official designation of the basin 
First, it is important to specify that the Chicoutimi river watershed includes that of Kenogami Lake since the Letellier judgment in 1911. This judgment designated the Chicoutimi River as the main outlet for the lake to the detriment of the Rivière aux Sables. The daily contributions of spills from Kenogami Lake into these rivers follow the following proportions: 2/3 go to the Chicoutimi river and 1/3 to the Sables river.

General description 

Du Laurentides Wildlife Reserve, the basin follows, in several places, steep slopes. The latter would also include three sub-basins (rivers Pikauba, Cyriac and aux-Écorces), two reservoirs (Kenogami and Pikauba) and part of the territory of each of the 5 former cities of Chicoutimi, Laterrière, Lac-Kénogami, Arvida and Jonquière which are now part of city of Saguenay.

The Chicoutimi river basin is also a sub-basin of the Saguenay River, which in turn flows into the St. Lawrence River and ends up in the Atlantic Ocean which drains most of the eastern Quebec rivers.

Flow management 
The Chicoutimi River, during the 20th century, saw its level rise significantly following the construction of numerous dams which made it pass from the stage of river to that of a succession of basins between Kénogami Lake and the Saguenay. In terms of flow control, four entities are involved in the management of dams:
 Quebec Department of Environment and Wildlife (Portage-des-roches Dam)
 City of Saguenay (Chute-Garneau and Pont-Arnaud)
 Elkem metal (Chute-Blanchette)
 Abitibi-Bowater (Chicoutimi)

Since the beginning of the 20th century, several works on the Kenogami Lake made it possible to regulate the flow of the Chicoutimi river and the Sables river which shared this same source. In order to ensure a constant supply to industries downstream from the rivers, water shares were supplied according to the demand, which differed between the cities of Chicoutimi and Jonquière. This approach triggered conflicts because the capacity to supply water to Kenogami Lake varied according to the seasons and the levels of the various structures did not allow an equitable sharing of flows. This situation was brought to court in 1911 resulting in the Letellier judgment which shared the contributions of the two main outlets from Kenogami Lake at 2/3 at the Chicoutimi river and 1/3 at the rivière-aux-Sables. Despite the changes in management, this rule is still in force today. The following year, in 1912, the construction of the Pont-Arnaud power station was completed.

The major enhancement of the waters of Kenogami Lake and the construction of retaining structures was envisaged in 1918. This mandate was given to the Commission des eaux running du Québec which plans to build the Portage-des-Roches dam which will be built with the Pibrac East and Pibrac West dams between 1923 and 1924.

Pro-riparian management versus pro-industry management 
The flow management of the Chicoutimi River is dependent on two factors:
 The safety of local residents, protection against flooding and the recreational and tourist development of the Kenogami Lake and the Chicoutimi River.
 Needs

Dams

Main floods (1971 to 1996)

Environment

Fauna

Flora

Pollution

History

The trading post 
The first permanent European installations in the Saguenay region were built at the confluence of the Chicoutimi and Saguenay rivers. Built in 1676 on the remains of a prehistoric Amerindian encampment, the Chicoutimi trading post, which included a commercial warehouse and a chapel, reached its peak at the end of the 17th century. It closed its doors in 1856.)

The pulp industry

The mills 

In 1847, Peter McLoed (son), founder of the town of Chicoutimi, built his second mill in the Bassin district, near the Chicoutimi River. On the latter's death, William Price, his only partner, took possession of all the mills in the region on behalf of the William Price and Company and bequeathed all to his sons who founded the Price Brothers and Company which became Abitibi-Price (now Abitibi-Consolidated, then AbitibiBowater).

La Pulperie 
According to the surveyor LM Deschênes (1888): 

On 24 November 1896, Joseph-Dominique Guay, mayor of Chicoutimi at the time, founded, with a few friends, “ La Compagnie de Pulpe de Chicoutimi ”, the first company managed by French Canadians working in the pulp and paper, and built a mill on the Chicoutimi River . The immense forest wealth upstream of the river greatly facilitates the growth of the company which becomes, in a short time, an internationally renowned pulp exporter. Under the management of Julien-Édouard-Alfred Dubuc, the Pulperie de Chicoutimi is expanding and, in all, three mills are built. The river becomes a means of transport of wood and a sufficient source of energy so that Chicoutimi becomes the world capital of the pulp which will supply England during the First World War. The company experienced its fall following the War, in the 1920s, and the Pulperie de Chicoutimi closed in 1930. Today it is the regional museum of Saguenay–Lac-Saint-Jean.

Hydroelectric installations 
By its jerky drop, its large current and its immense source of water, the Chicoutimi river became, with the arrival of industries, a place of choice for establishing electrical installations. Over time, several dams have regulated the flow of the river and today it is largely controlled artificially.

In all, four hydroelectric plants are located on the Chicoutimi River. Those of Pont-Arnaud and Chute-Garneau, put into service in 1912 and 1925, are no longer active today. The Chicoutimi power station and Elkem Métal, commissioned in 1923 and 1957, are still in use.

Power plants

The Saguenay flood

The flood 

Between 19 and July 20, 1996, the watershed of Kenogami Lake receives  of rain (equivalent about one and a half times the lake at full capacity). The quantity of water retained by the Portage-des-Roches dam (which usually retains  of water), in Laterrière, becomes dangerously high and forces Hydro-Québec to fully open the dam gates (more than /s are discharged for a maximum capacity of /s) to prevent it from yielding. At this instant, the flow of the Chicoutimi river suddenly goes from /s to /s. The huge spill of water alters the river bed and several dwellings (notably in Rang Saint-Pierre) are completely surrounded by this immense flood which sweeps away several dwellings completely uprooting them from their foundations. Most of the debris from these houses hit the bridge on Portage-Des-Roches road in Laterrière which could give way under the pressure of debris carried by the current.

The drinking water intake of the city of Chicoutimi is uprooted and the municipality will install a pump nearby to provide service.

The Chute-Blanchette dam manages to resist the flood by opening its valves to the maximum (/s) which let water pass through the spillway near Pulperie de Chicoutimi. The body of water borrows the spillway and the central Elkem metal and is found, at its exit, around the regional museum. The flood exceeds the water capacity of the spillway and makes its way through two of the old mills of the Pulperie. The installations of the summer theater are completely submerged by the current that comes out of the windows of the old mill, which has been completely destroyed. At this time, the water is only less than a kilometer from the Saguenay River.

Arriving in the city center, in the Bassin district, the flood violently bypasses the last dam (Chicoutimi dam, /s) and rages on the Bassin district. Completely flooded in a part of the district and uprooted around the dam, the residences suffered heavy losses in this sector.

However, despite the significant material losses during the overflow of the Chicoutimi River, there were no human losses in this sector. However, approximately 6000 residents were evacuated during the 1996 flood (4000 at Chicoutimi and 2000 at Laterrière). The Chicoutimi River was the second most affected watercourse after the rivière à Mars of La Baie during the deluge.

Damage and reconstruction 
 Modification of the course of the river.
 10 houses destroyed in Laterrière
 14 houses destroyed in Chicoutimi
 Damage to 263 residences for a total of $5,420,000.
 Significant damage to Chute-Garneau
 Repairing the damage to Pont-Arnaud cost $20 million
 The repair of the damage to the Alcan intake amounted to $6 million and the repair of the company's railway lines cost $20 million.
 Significant damage to the Pulperie de Chicoutimi

River occupancy

Facilities

Residential developments

Demography

Industrial facilities

Agricultural facilities

Water extraction 

 Chicoutimi borough drinking water
 Drinking water from the Jonquière borough
 Alcan water intake

Transport

Bridges 

 Pont du Boulevard Saguenay
 Pont de la rue Price
 Pont en fer du Canadien National (aujourd'hui piste cyclable)
 Pont de la rue Dubuc
 Pont Ulric Blackburn (boulevard Barette)
 Chemin de fer Alcan
 Pont-Arnaud
 Pont de l'Autoroute 70
 Pont du Boulevard du Royaume Ouest
 Pont du Père-Honorat
 Portage-Des-Roches

See also 
 St. Lawrence River
 List of rivers of Quebec

References

External links 

 The site of the Quebec Ministry of Natural Resources and Wildlife
 The Musée du Fjord website
 The Pulperie de Chicoutimi website

Rivers of Saguenay–Lac-Saint-Jean
Geography of Saguenay, Quebec